The 2011 Ebonyi State gubernatorial election was the 5th gubernatorial election of Ebonyi State. Held on April 26, 2011, the People's Democratic Party nominee Martin Elechi won the election, defeating Julius Ucha of the All Nigeria Peoples Party.

Results 
A total of 9 candidates contested in the election. Martin Elechi from the People's Democratic Party won the election, defeating Julius Ucha from the All Nigeria Peoples Party. Valid votes was 451,459.

References 

Ebonyi State gubernatorial elections
Ebonyi gubernatorial
April 2011 events in Nigeria